Chevon Walker (born May 9, 1987 in Montego Bay, Jamaica) is a former professional Canadian football running back and kick returner. He played NCAA football for the Sioux Falls Cougars. He played two years of his career as a professional football player in the Canadian Football League for the Hamilton Tiger-Cats. In 2014, the Ottawa Redblacks selected him in the expansion draft. He started the 2015 season with the Ottawa Redblacks before he was released on August 28, 2015. On September 1, 2015, it was announced that Walker had signed with the Winnipeg Blue Bombers. Chevon Walker has over 1000 rushing yards and seven touchdowns in three years of professional play.

CFL statistics

Notes and references

External links
Winnipeg Blue Bombers bio
Ottawa RedBlacks bio
Hamilton Tiger-Cats bio

Canadian football running backs
Hamilton Tiger-Cats players
Ottawa Redblacks players
1987 births
Living people
Sioux Falls Cougars football players
Jamaican players of Canadian football
Jamaican players of American football
Florida Gators football players
Florida Gators men's track and field athletes
Eastern Illinois Panthers football players